Épinay-sous-Sénart (literally Épinay under Sénart) is a commune in the Essonne department in Île-de-France in northern France.

Population
Inhabitants of Épinay-sous-Sénart are known as Spinoliens.

Twin towns

  Peacehaven
  Isernhagen

See also
Communes of the Essonne department

References

External links

Official website 
Mayors of Essonne Association 

Communes of Essonne